The father–son rule is a rule used for recruiting in the Australian Football League, along with an equivalent father-daughter rule in its women's competition, AFL Women's: both allow clubs first recruiting access to the son or daughter of a long-serving member of that club.

The father-son rule has existed since 1949, while the father-daughter rule has existed since the AFLW's formation in 2017.

Criteria are also in place for equivalent mother–son and mother–daughter rules, from such time as the children of AFLW players reach draft eligible age (i.e. at least 18 years of age on 31 December in the year in which they are drafted).

The following is a complete list of father–son draftees since 1986, when an entry draft was first established in the league, and also a complete list of father–daughter draftees since the AFLW's formation in 2017.

AFL

AFL Women's

References

Australian Football League
Australian Football League draft
Australian Football
Australian rules football-related lists